Heinz Lechner (born 26 April 1928) is an Austrian former fencer. He competed at the 1948 and 1952 Summer Olympics.

References

External links
 

1928 births
Possibly living people
Austrian male fencers
Austrian sabre fencers
Olympic fencers of Austria
Fencers at the 1948 Summer Olympics
Fencers at the 1952 Summer Olympics